The Internet Crime Complaint Center (IC3) is a division of the Federal Bureau of Investigation (FBI) concerning suspected Internet-facilitated criminal activity. The IC3 gives victims a convenient and easy-to-use reporting mechanism that alerts authorities of suspected criminal or civil violations on the Internet. The IC3 develops leads and notifies law enforcement agencies at the federal, state, local and international level. Information sent to the IC3 is analyzed and disseminated for investigative and intelligence purposes to law enforcement and for public awareness.

History 
The IC3 was founded in 2000 as the Internet Fraud Complaint Center (IFCC), primarily focusing on online fraud, such as intellectual property rights matters, computer intrusions, economic espionage, online extortion, international money laundering, identity theft, and other Internet-facilitated crimes.

With the realization that crimes facilitated online have a chance to overlap with other crimes, and that not all crimes committed or facilitated online are just fraud, the IFCC was renamed to the Internet Crime Complaint Center in October 2003 to better reflect the broad character of such matters, and to minimize the need for one to distinguish online fraud from other potentially overlapping cyber crimes.

See also
 List of convicted computer criminals

References

External links 
 
 2012 Press Releases by the Internet Crime Complaint Center (IC3)
 Intelligence Note Prepared by the Internet Crime Complaint Center (IC3), January 20, 2012 
 New Internet Crime Initiative combines Resources, Expertise FBI, September 24, 2013
 2016 IC3 Annual Report

Computer security organizations
Federal Bureau of Investigation
Crime in the United States